"Sunshine" is a song by American pop rock band OneRepublic, it was released on November 10, 2021, from their sixth EP Sunshine. The EP. The band's frontman Ryan Tedder and bassist Brent Kutzle wrote the song with Casey Smith, Noel Zancanella, Tyler Spry and Zach Skelton, while Tedder and Kutzle also produced it with Spry and Simon Oscroft.

Content
"Sunshine" is the theme song from the film Clifford the Big Red Dog (2021). The song is written in the key of F major, with a tempo of 140 beats per minute.

Credits and personnel
Credits adapted from Tidal.

 Brent Kutzle – producer, composer, lyricist
 Ryan Tedder – producer, composer, lyricist
 Simon Oscroft – producer, associated performer, engineer, guitar, studio personnel
 Tyler Spry – producer, composer, lyricist, associated performer, engineer, guitar, studio personnel
 Casey Smith – composer, lyricist
 Noel Zancanella – composer, lyricist
 Zach Skelton – composer, lyricist
 Brian Willett – associated performer, keyboards
 Joe Henderson – associated performer, engineer, studio personnel, vocal producer
 Loren Ferard – associated performer, guitar
 Chris Gehringer – mastering engineer, studio personnel
 John Nathaniel – mixer, studio personnel

Charts

Weekly charts

Year-end charts

Certifications

References

2021 singles
2021 songs
OneRepublic songs
Song recordings produced by Ryan Tedder
Songs written by Brent Kutzle
Songs written by Ryan Tedder
Songs written by Noel Zancanella
Songs written by Zach Skelton